Rhytiphora frenchiana is a species of beetle in the family Cerambycidae. It was described by Stephan von Breuning in 1961. It is known from Australia.

References

frenchiana
Beetles described in 1961